The 1999 European Short Track Speed Skating Championships took place between 22 and 24 January 1999  in Oberstdorf, Germany.

Medal summary

Medal table

Men's events

Women's events

Participating nations 

  (2/4)
  (1/0)
  (1/1)
  (2/4)
  (1/0)
  (0/1)
  (2/1)
  (4/4)
  (4/4)
  (4/2)
  (1/0)
  (5/4)
  (4/0)
  (4/4)
  (2/0)
  (2/0)
  (2/4)
  (1/0)
  (4/0)
  (1/0)
  (1/4)

See also
Short track speed skating
European Short Track Speed Skating Championships

External links
Detailed results
Results overview

European Short Track Speed Skating Championships
European Short Track Speed Skating Championships
European
European Short Track Speed Skating Championships